Maddam Sir is an Indian Hindi-language comedy action television series that aired from 24 February 2020 to 18 February 2023 on Sony SAB and digitally streamed on SonyLIV. Produced by Jay Mehta under Jay Production, it starred Gulki Joshi, Yukti Kapoor, Sonali Naik and Bhavika Sharma.

Plot
The series revolves around four Lucknow-based female police officers and one male officer who work at a Mahila Police Station that consists of S.H.O. Haseena Mallik, S.I. Karishma Singh, Head Constable Pushpa Singh and Constable Santosh Sharma along with a male Constable Cheeteshwar Chaturvedi. They are helped by a prisoner-turned-spy Billeshwar Champat. Karishma Singh is short-tempered while Haseena Malik is emotional in solving cases which sometimes creates a conflict between them.

DSP Anubhav Singh is a negotiation specialist and a secret agent in IB, also the cousin of Karishma comes to sort out the differences between them and becomes successful in it. Despite their differences, they truly respect each other. Karishma soon becomes a protective friend to Haseena, always defending the latter and shielding her from all harm possible. The Thana continues solving various cases. Soon, love brews between Haseena Malik and Anubhav Singh. Haseena proposes to Anubhav which he accepts, but later Haseena learns that he pretended to love her for a mission of national security. After being successful in the mission, Anubhav realises that he was wrong to have used Haseena for the mission, also he realises that he was actually in love with Haseena from the beginning. So he apologises to her, confesses his love for her and proposes marriage to her. Yet, she rejects it fearing another heartbreak. However, things between them get better with every passing day and they come closer. Eventually, Haseena accepts Anubhav's proposal and they plan their engagement. On their engagement day, Anubhav is ordered to call off his marriage and is told to leave his city for a mission of national security. A mission from which he might not return alive. Being helpless, he leaves Haseena as being with him can be a threat to her life as well with the help of Karishma. And their story takes a pause. However, circumstances bring them together again after months.

A new case comes up when the Thana gets a humanoid, ASI Mira, for a trial of 90 days to test whether it is successful to teach about human emotions to her. However, Karishma feels the robot is trying to take the place of human police officers. Karishma and Meera solve cases together and the former uses Haseena's philosophy and handles the cases her way. While returning to her police station, Haseena collides with a secret agent who has to deliver a hard disc containing the details of all the secret agents in the country. The leader of the perpetrators who killed the agent after failing to get the disk from him hacks Mira to get it and orders her to kill Haseena. Mira shoots but realises it afterward and tells everybody in the police station. They realise that Mira has attained the emotions which Haseena wanted to add but dismantle her to prevent her from getting hacked again. Everyone including Karishma salutes her and feels her loss.

A month later, Pushpa and Karishma meet Urmila Mahadev Mhatre in Mumbai, Haseena's lookalike a Marathi Vada-pav seller when they go to Mumbai. Karishma devises a plan of taking Urmila to Lucknow disguising her as Haseena Malik which will help her catch Haseena's murderers. It is later revealed that Urmila is none other than Haseena herself. She disguised herself on the order of her senior, secret agent Ajay Bakshi to catch the perpetrators involved in terror activities who also tried to kill Haseena for the hard disc containing sensitive information of the agents which if goes in the wrong hands can be a threat to national security. Bakshi suspects that someone from her station is involved in hacking Mira. After a while Haseena is convinced that no one from her station hacked Mira. Later Bakshi suspects Anubhav, but changes it after Anubhav saves Haseena from goons. Haseena is convinced that Anubhav isn't the hacker and reveals him about her identity. Karishma finds out about the Hard Drive and Anubhav tells her to guard it safely. IPS Chandramukhi Chautala enters and helps MPT officers in a case involving a stolen mummy. Soon Haseena finds out that there is Anubhav's hand behind all this. She steals the hard drive from Karishma and accuses Anubhav for being a traitor to the nation. She shoots Anubhav, who shoots her back, leading Haseena to lose her memory. Karishma destroys the pen drive and shoots Anubhav to dead, but Haseena lost her memory. Haseena regains her memory at a fight and reunites with her MPT team.

Amar Vidrohi with his team enters the Mahila Police Thana which makes cases interesting with the rivalry between the two police teams to get permanent control over MPT. Soon Cheeta and Santosh confess their love to each other while Haseena goes underground to prove her innocence from false charges. While Amar realises that MPT belongs to the MPT team only and leaves, Misri Pandey marks her re-entry this time as SHO. Soon it is revealed that she along with her politician uncle framed Haseena and they get jailed and Haseena returns back with full dignity.

Soon Karishma's twin sister, Kaushalya aka Kareena who in her bid to become an actress fled with money saved by their father for Karishma's admission in the police force arrives back in Lucknow to play a female cop in her upcoming movie and asks Karishma to train her with Police tactics. She becomes friendly with the MPT team and Haseena asks them to swap their places in an attempt to make them realize the difficulties faced in each other's jobs. Eventually, Karishma forgives Kareena and reconciles with her after learning about her sacrifices for their father. Later, the MPT team finds out that Kareena is unknowingly planned to be used as a suicide bomber by a terrorist group and rescues her. Kareena bids farewell to the MPT team and leaves for Chennai for pursuing her career.

Post Kareena's farewell, conflicts arise between Haseena and Karishma which leads to a competition between. Haseena won the competition by 1 vote which made Karishma Singh to follow Haseena's way of solving the cases.

Soon, Chingari Gang comes into the picture and tries to replace the police. They provide justice to all women by torturing and traumatising the men who harass the women. Haseena and the team members try to stop them but fail each time. Due to Cheetah's negligence, he was about to get suspended but then Santosh took the blame on herself and got suspended. Karishma secretly joins Chingari Gang to end their gang. Meanwhile Cheetah and Binni talk through an online app and fall in love, they decided to meet but Cheetah found out that the one who he was talking with is actually Binni, Haseena learns about it and tell Cheetah to continue to date Binni to gain her trust so she'll gain some prove and end the Chingari Gang. Cheetah does the same and Haseena catches Karishma in Chingari Gang's saree while chasing them. Haseena tell Karishma to continue the drama. Shivani learns about Binni-Cheetah's affair and removes her from her post. Later Binni decide to leave Chingari Gang but learns Karishma is betraying Chingari Gang so she called Shivani and tells her. Shivani tries to kill Karishma meanwhile Haseena and others arrive to save her then Shivani tried to kill Haseena but mistakenly kills Saira Begum. Shivani decides to take all the blame of Chingari Gang on herself and surrenders to the MPT.

Mira comes back with upgraded version as "Mira G". Mira G can predict crimes that will happen in future and after getting shot on her wrist watch she was sent back to C.A.R.D. Research Institute.

ACP Naina Mathur who is former batchmate and friend of Haseena came to Lucknow for a search of criminal Cherry. She moves back to her hometown after Haseena and Karishma successfully catched Cherry when she tried to kill Naina.

Later on a girl named Shaziya Siddiqui, an aspiring police officer arrives at MPT claiming herself to be Haseena's cousin for her Police exams. Later on it is revealed that she escaped with her mother's help from a village named Devariya where 2 brothers control the whole village and announced it illegal for girls to make a name for themselves and even kidnaps Shaziya's mother Nagma to get her back. However Team MPT succeeds in giving Shaziya and Nagma their justice with extended support of Santu, Mira G, Misri and Shivani now as an Allahabad High Court advocate. Haseena and Karishma raise their voice against Devariya's MLA for the failed Law and Order and he vows to take revenge upon them. Haseena gets promoted to DSP and MPT gets blasted with media assuming whole Team MPT to be dead. Later it takes a leap of few months with Haseena describing her journey with team MPT indicating that she survived the blast.

Cast

Main
 Gulki Joshi as S.H.O. Haseena Malik aka Maddam Sir – SHO of MPT; Shahjahan and Noorjahan's daughter; Anubhav's ex-fiancée; Karishma's mentor and close friend, Naina’s friend and batchmate;She always handles case with intelligence and emotions believing ending crime, not criminals. She is very kindhearted and always tries to stop Karishma Singh from taking the wrong step in rage. Her team means a lot to her. She is called MADDAM SIR by her police station members. She has a catchphrase, "Tajurba Kehta Hai Hamara" (My experience says that) when she gets an idea. In the end of series she gets promoted to DSP and indicates that she survived the fatal blast at MPT. (2020–2023)
 Yukti Kapoor as
S.I. Karishma Singh – SI at MPT; Kaushalya's twin-sister; Anubhav's cousin; Pushpa and Pyare's  daughter-in-law; Haseena's protective close friend. She had a love-marriage with Pushpa's son who works as a senior executive at Jaina Enterprise. She is short-tempered and believes in strict policing. She dislikes Haseena's way of solving cases but she always ends up helping Haseena in her plan. Despite their differences, they love and respect each other. She is tough on the outside but inside she cares very much for people close to her. She has a catchphrase, "Darogaji dekhe to bahut par tumsa nahi dekha" (You must have seen many inspectors but none like me) while handling criminals. (2020–2023)
Kaushalya Singh alias Kareena (stage name) – An actress; Karishma's twin-sister; Anubhav's cousin. She is completely opposite in nature from Karishma. To become an actress, she ran away with jewelry and the money which their father earned for Karishma's admission in police force, which made Karishma's family to kept her a secret from Pushpa. Later, she returned to Lucknow to play a cop. However, she was unknowingly planned to be used as a suicide bomber by a terrorist group, but was finally rescued by the MPT team. At the end, she went back to Chennai for purse her career after reconciling with Karishma. She fondly called Karishma as "Kari Amma", Pushpa as "Pushpa Amma, Guru Ji"(Pushpa mother, Teacher) and Haseena as "Senior Sundari" (Beauty Queen Senior). (2022)
 Bhavika Sharma as Cyber Crime Specialist Constable Santosh "Santu" Sharma – A police officer in charge of cyber-crime; Cheetah's love-interest. She often behaves childishly but is good at internet-related matters. She wants to achieve high before getting married. Cheetah had a one-sided love for her. She rejected his love when he expressed his feelings towards her but accepted him after realizing that she is also in love with him and proposed him. She got suspended due to Cheetah's negligence. (2020–2022; 2023)
 Sonali Pandit Naik as Head Constable Pushpa Singh – The oldest member of MPT and Counselling Head; Pyare's widow; Karishma's mother-in-law. She always fights with Karishma over petty things but deep inside has immense love for her. The MPT officers are distraught about her overacting. She wants to lead and solve at least one case before her retirement and gets successful in doing so. She has a catchphrase, "Hamare lalla ke toh bhaag hi phoot gaye" (My son is doomed) because she dreams of becoming a grandmother and believes that Karishma cares of her zero-figure that is why she has not given birth to her grandkid yet. (2020–2023)
 Yashkant Sharma as Constable Cheeteshwar "Cheetah" Chaturvedi – A women's psychology specialist at MPT; Santu's love-interest. Earlier he used to be very lazy but later becomes responsible. He had a one-sided love for Santosh. She rejected his proposal when he tried to express his feelings towards her but accepted him after realizing his true love during her depression phase. He had a catchphrase, "Uff ye masumiyat" (Oh! Her innocence) when Santosh used to do any mistake, which often irritated Karishma Singh. (2020)
 Priyanshu Singh replaced Sharma as Cheeteshwar. (2020–2023)
 Ajay Jadhav as
 Billeshwar "Billu" Champat – He is a thief turned spy who loves to live in jail because he doesn't have any other place to live. However, he helps his police counterparts often in solving cases by being a spy on criminals. He has a close relationship with all MPT Officers. He has a catchphrase, "Jiske peeche pad jaaye, uske muh se nikle haay haay, I'm Billu the Spy!" (The one I start following says, Hi! I'm Billu the spy!). (2020–2023)
 Commissioner Vikram Ghosh – Billu's lookalike; New Commissioner of Lucknow; Shobhna's husband. A strict and punctual to time officer, He was supposed to do a surprise inspection of MPT & initially MPT mistakes him to be Billu, who was rehearsing as Commissioner for his local skit at the time of his arrival. However they gets shocked when Billu arrives in the scene and in his ego Ghosh ends up challenging Haseena and Karishma with the task of his security to prove that female cops can take place of male cops. He changes his mentality after MPT team saves his and Billu's lives from some dacoits & successfully makes him reach a press conference on time to save his dignity of being a punctual officer. (2023)

Recurring
 Satyapal Landge as Badnaam – Tea seller of the MPT locality. He is often slapped by Karishma for making bad tea and often does mimicry of Bollywood superstars. (2020–2023)
 Ashwani Rathore as Iqbal – The barber of the MPT locality. He used to tell made-up stories to Pushpa and Santosh. (2020–2023)
 Darpan Shrivastava as Usman – The Biriyani Seller of MPT locality. (2020)
 Harveer Singh replaced Shrivastava as Usman. (2020)
 Gaurav Wadhwa as Reporter Sunny Chaddha – He has a crush on Santosh and tries to impress her and has a competition with Cheetah. He helps MPT Team to solve cases with his reporting skills. Whenever he is reporting the news on TV, he has a catchphrase "Tazi khabron ka ek lauta adda, aapka apna Sunny Chaddha" (The only place to get fresh news with your favourite, Sunny Chaddha). (2020; 2022)
 Jatin Arora replaced Wadhwa as Sunny Chaddha. (2020–2021)
 Rajesh Dubey as DSP Mahesh Singh – He was the DSP before Anubhav and had got transferred himself to his hometown but he joined Lucknow again after Anubhav went on his mission. He is a foodie who loves Pushpa's cooking and food. (2020; 2021–2023)
 Umesh Bajpai as Fassruddin Nawab Sahab – Owner of the mansion where the MPT is situated; Raees and Zeenat's father. He has a huge crush on Head Constable Pushpa Singh. (2020–2023)
 Nimesh Soni as
 Bulbul Pandey – S.H.O. of Jankipooram Police Thaana; Pallavi's husband; Champak's senior and brother-in-law. He is a MPT's competitor who wants to let MPT officers down. Later he is being transferred to Mahila Police Thana temporarily and creates a rift between Haseena and Karishma. (2020–2023)
 Kartik Bajaj – The owner of a cab driving company who thought that women can't drive. (2020)
 Balli – LPJ diet plan company's owner who fooled people. (2020)
 Amit Kumar Sinha as Champak Chaudhary – A Constable at Jankipooram Police Thaana; Pallavi's brother; Bulbul's junior and brother-in-law. He often interrupts and insults Bulbul. (2020–2023)
 Disha Savla as Pallavi Pandey – Champak's sister; Bulbul's wife. (2020,2022–2023)
 Rahil Azam as DSP Anubhav Singh – A negotiation specialist in IB and DSP of Lucknow; Karishma and Kaushalya 's cousin; Haseena's ex-fiancé. He pretended to be in love with Haseena Malik for a mission, but later, actually fell in love. He was ordered to call off his marriage with Haseena. However, circumstances brought them together again. He always supported the MPT. But later, he turned villain to avenge the wrong done to his father by the nation. Karishma and Haseena killed him. (2020-2021; 2021-2022)
 Esha Kansara as S.I./S.H.O Misri Pandey – She was a corrupt police officer who came to MPT, temporarily. She was promoted to S.I. with her uncle's help, who was an influential politician. She used to take bribes from criminals and protect them now she is S.H.O  with the help from her politician uncle's help who sent her to MPT to find Haseena Malik with whom he has a past rivalry. (2020; 2022; 2023)
 Roopa Divetia as Noorjahan Malik – Haseena's mother. Karishma Singh is also like a younger daughter to her. She is always worried about her daughter's wedding. (2021)
 Utkarsha Naik replaced Divetia as Noorjahan (2021–2023)
 Salman Shaikh as Rajvir Tomar aka Computer – Head Constable of Jankipooram Police Thaana. He has a crush on Karishma Singh unknowing that she is married. (2021)
 Jignesh Modi as Chedi – A Constable at Jankipooram Police Thaana. (2021)
 Pankhuri Awasthy Rode as ASI Mira – A humanoid robot police officer invented by C.A.R.D. Research Institute who was sent to MPT for a 90 days trial and to learn emotions and was working under Karishma Singh as her assistant. She used to both irritate and entertain MPT officers by mimicking them with their combined traits. She ended up shooting Haseena fatally when her system got hacked which lead Karishma to switch off her button permanently. She had become full of emotions by the end. She came back to the MPT as Mira G.(2021–2022; 2022–2023; 2023)
 Prakash Ramchandani as Secret Agent Ajay Bakshi – He is Anubhav's senior who restricted him to get engaged to Haseena. He saved Haseena's life and asked her to disguise as Urmila Mahadev Mhatre, a Vada pav seller in Mumbai to catch the people who tried to murder her for the hard disk. (2021–2022, 2023)
 Savi Thakur as S.H.O. Amar Vidrohi – Yogita's younger brother; Bunty's adoptive father; A newly appointed male in-charge of the MPT as MPT turns into a common police station. There, he creates challenges for the lady officers as he comes as an opponent for the MPT officers. Later he accepts defeat and leaves MPT handing over it to MPT officers permanently. (2022)
 Jay Pathak as Head Constable Harendra Singh aka Deewan Ji – A newly appointed male head constable of MPT under Amar Vidrohi. (2022)
 Rachana Parulkar as Advocate Shivani Pawar aka Shivani  Tai– formerly Leader of Chingaari Gang; now Advocate She is smart, intelligent and wanted to become a lawyer. She is kicked out by her family after her lover humiliated her. Later, she met Saira begum who gave her motive to live and the Chingaari gang. She and her gang teach women to live with self-respect and serve justice to them by their own-style. After Saira Begum's death she surrendered to police and took all blame of Chingari Gang on herself. Later she comes back as an Advocate from Allahabad High Court to help team MPT in giving justice to a girl Shaziya and her mother Nagma from the goon brothers of her village. (2022; 2023)
 Prachi Bohra as Binny Chaudhary – Member of Chingaari Gang. She is loud and strong. She is traumatized after being harassed by group of men and joined Chingaari Gang after that. She has the duty of making every woman strong, who joins Chingaari gang. (2022)
 Sulabha Arya as Saira Begum – Senior member of Chingaari Gang. She was a victim of domestic violence and returned to Lucknow after her husband died. She is the founder of Chingaari gang. She was mistakenly shot by Shivani and then she died. (2022)

Guest
 Divyangana Jain as:
Rani – She used the faces of Haseena Malik & Qayamat (Karishma Singh) to do illegal activities. She was arrested for being Fake Haseena Malik, but she escaped from the jail and used Qayamat's face to do crime. She was arrested again. (2020; 2021)
Cherry – A mastermind criminal for whom Naina was searching since long and was transferred to Lucknow. Later she was arrested by Haseena and Karishma and Naina went back to her hometown (2023)
Shilpa Shinde as ACP Naina Mathur – Haseena's batchmate and friend. She came to Lucknow for a search of criminal Cherry. She moves back to her hometown after Haseena and Karishma successfully catched Cherry when she tried to kill Naina. (2023)
 Vaishali Thakkar as Head Constable Babita Sarkar – She came to Mahila Police Thana as a replacement for Pushpa for a few days. She is a police academy trainer who had taught Haseena and Karishma during their training days. (2020)
 Roopam Sharma as Mona – She was a clinical psychologist, to whom Haseena Malik used to consult. She was pretending to be S.I. Barbie Upadhyay, she used to add pills in Haseena Malik's coffee, causing hallucinations. She was the mastermind behind the racket but pretended to be a naive and responsible officer. (2021)
 Lakshya Handa as Avtaar Kapoor – Karishma's boss. (2021)
 Kavita Kaushik as IPS Chandramukhi Chautala from F.I.R.. She had come to solve the case of stolen Mummy. She was impressed by the MPT team. (2022)
 Shubhangi Gokhale as Cheeteshwar's aunt – She loves to read the famous detective novel Byomkesh Bakshi. Cheetah feared to tell her about his and Santu's live-in relationship, thinking she won't support them, hence introduced Santu as the wife of his friend, Champak, who remain overseas for his job. To cover up their lie, Cheetah and Santu posed Billu as Champak for few days. But, Billu returned to MPT in pretext of work, seeing her over-doubtful nature. Later, she suspected Cheetah and Santu are having an extra-marital affair and spied over them. Finally, she learned about Santu and Cheetah's affair and refused to accept their live-in relationship. She has a catchphrase "Bakshi Bhaiyya Kehke Gaye Hain Kuchh Toh Gadbad Hai" (Mr. Bakshi had said that there is something fishy) (2022)
 Simmi Ghoshal as Binno – Victim of Noise Pollution (2021)
 Guru Saran Tiwari as Yash Kapoor – Director of Kareena's film. Later, he is revealed to be involved with terrorist group, who tried to use Kareena as a suicide bomber. (2022)
 Trishna Vivek as
 Dr. Archana Nagar – A doctor who used to do illegal gender tests. (2020)
 Sudha Narayan – A NCG officer who suspected Haseena to be a drug smuggler. (2020)
 Mahi Sharma as 
 Mahi – Fake Karishma Singh. (2020)
 Nisha Amrit – Roshni's mother. She is a social media blogger who was accused of being involved in a terrorist association. (2021)
 Neha Tiwari as Chandu – Fake Santosh Sharma. (2020)
 Shefali Rana as Fake Pushpa Singh (2020)
 Ananya Dwivedi as Zoya – A kid who was a victim of kidney disease. She needed to be transplant a kidney elsewhere MPT officers find out about a kidney racket. At the end, She was saved by her doctor who donated his own kidney to her. (2020)
 Rishikesh Ingley as 
 Dr. Vikas – Zoya's doctor who saved her life by donating his own kidney. (2020)
 Rahul – A fraud cashier who kept real cash exchanging them with fake notes. (2021)
 Pallavi Pradhan as Savitri Singh – Ajay's mother. She was mistreated by her son and daughter-in-law. But, later she got respect. (2020)
 Govind Khatri as Mahipal Singh – Genda's husband; Mansi's father; Haseena's adoptive uncle; Owner of Prasuti Charitable Hospital. He took care of Haseena after her father died. He was accused for the conspiracy behind his hospital, but later proved innocent. (2021)
 Hunar Hali Gandhi as Genda Rani – Mahipal's wife; Mansi's adoptive mother. She is the mastermind behind the conspiracy that injecting a virus to pregnant ladies at Prasuti Charitable Hospital. (2021)
 Swasti Katyal as Mansi Singh – Mahipal's daughter; Genda's adopted daughter. (2021)
 Tarka Pednekar as
 Gauri – Asthana's sister. She was proven dead to world by her own brother to get her property. (2020)
 Manu – Rani's right hand and advisor. (2021)
 Dolly – A divorcee women who was harassed by her boss. (2021)
 Anupama Prakash as Ileana - Billu's girlfriend (2020)
 Manoj Chandila as,
 Ajay Kumar – An actor who insulted Pushpa Singh and police. Later he realized his mistake (2020)
 Manav – Keshav's boss (2020)
 Kareena's co-star in her film (2022)
 Pranay Dixit as,
 An actor who was invited for Santosh Sharma's fake wedding to get beaten up but instead got beaten by Santosh in real (2020)
 Mr. Joseph – Head chef of 'Yo Kabab' company (2020)
 Victor – Nancy's husband who was involved with a dangerous criminal Musa (2020)
 Shankar – Haldi's first husband who blackmails her (2020)
 Shekhar – A man who wants his wife Pallavi to focus on herself because she never let her family do any work (2021)
 Rohit – Chandrika's husband (2021)
 Abhinav Jasuja – A gym owner who was falsely accused by wife for domestic violence (2021)
 Mukesh aka Qaidi Zameer – A crime detective novelist (2021)
 Subod – Jharna's husband (2021)
Rohit – Mayui's husband who cheats on her (2022)
 Arun – A man who pretends to be blind (2022)
 Narayan – Dhanalakshmi's husband who hides his phone from his wife in order to hide his financial problems. (2022)
 Barkha's husband who used to torture his wife (2023)
 Preeti Shukhla as,
 Sona – Montu's wife who was irritated with her husband's app (2020)
 Simran – Rahul's wife who went into Mahila Police Thana with bomb (2020)
 Chandrika – Rohit's wife who appoints private detective to keep an eye on her husband (2021)
 Rupa Jasuja – Abhinav's wife who falsely accuses her husband for domestic violence (2021)
 Jharna, Subod's wife (2021)
 Manju – A nurse who was pressurized by handling both career and family alone (2022)
 Trisha – A lady who was facing hallucinations (2022)
 Meethi Shukla – A lady who forcefully captured their landlord's house with her mother-in-law. (2022)
 Kunnal Sheth as,
 Monty Sharma – Sona's husband who created App Zara which could replace wives (2020)
 Radhe – Haseena's helper who was rejected of getting paternity leave (2020)
 Gopal – Fake husbands of Nawab Sahab's female unmarried tenants (2020)
 Keshav – He was being pressurized his boss to work 24/7 and couldn't give time to his wife. (2021)
 Kailash – He was being cheated by an online friend (2021)
 Jaidev – An actor who does ads on pan masala (2021)
 Manu – Tanu's husband, who is 5 years younger to his wife (2022)
 Rohan Acharya – Owner of Ummidhai website, where poor people are provided with medical help (2022)
 Kamal Sharma – He was abandoned by his brother as he was suffering from amnesia (2022)
 Urvi Gor as,
 Alia – She was being ill treated by her brother-in-law (2021)
 Trisha Gulati – She was kidnapped on New Year's Eve (2021)
 Chorni – A thief who did fake marriage with Cheetah Chaturvedi (2022)
 Soneer Vadhera as,
 Rahul Mallya – Simran's husband. He threatened to blast a bomb to get respect from in-laws. (2020)
 Shekhar – Shikha's husband whose new born child was stolen (2020)
 Ashok – A drunkerd who used to annoy his wife. (2021)
 Rajesh – Indu's husband as Nawab's tenant. He and his wife often quarreled unable to understand each other, irritating MPT officers. (2022)
 Urmila Tiwari as,
 Anita Chauhan – Vijay's wife. She fell prey to Baba Rangrasiya's means to cure her relationship. (2020)
 Shalini – A beauty parlour owner who is cheated in a dating app. (2021)
 Pratha – A girl who was forced to follow superstition rituals by her mother to her marriage. (2021)
 Priyali Singh – Fake Aparna Bansal. (2021)
 Nafeesa Ansari – A lady don who used to earn money from fake crowdfunding campaigns. (2022)
 Asha – Badnam's sister (2022)
 Shrashti Maheshwari as Riya – Commissioner's daughter. She is a famous writer who known as RYKK (Riya Yeh Kya Kiya). She came to MPT to write about the station. (2022)
 Piya Valecha as Mrs. Malkhani – Owner of Batterfly club where Saree was band. (2021)  
 Amit Mistry as Vijay Chauhan – Anita's husband. He was tired of his wife being conned by Rangrasiya baba. (2020)
 Dolly Chawla as,
 Haldi - Brijesh's wife who was ill-treated by her ex-husband's parents (2020)
 Indu – Rajesh's wife (2022)
 Apara Jariwala as Sarita Singh – Pushpa's aunt-in-law; Karishma's grandaunt-in-law. She was against women empowerment thinking married women can't handle both family and career and boycotted Pushpa for the same. At the end, she realized her mistake after Manju's case and Karishma defended Pushpa. (2022) 
 Tejal Adivarekar as Malaika – Pushpa and Karishma's househelp. (2021, 2022)
 Ashish Pawar as Sajan – Urmila's (Haseena) supporter, friend and admirer. (2022)
 Prem Vallabh as Mr. Chaturvedi – Cheeta's father. (2022)
 Anju Rajiv as Mrs. Chaturvedi – Cheeta's mother. (2022)
 Anupama Solanki as Dipti – A creative director working in star advertising agency. She was fired by her boss as she is pregnant thinking she'll become a liability for company. Later, she fought back for her rights and got the job. (2022) 
 Abhay Bhadoriya as Bunty – A teenager who was addict to eating pizza, blackmailing others. (2022)
Akansha Sharma as Rama – Karishma's childhood best-friend who had to take permission from her husband and mother-in-law for everything. Later she fought for her rights with MPT team's support (2022)
 Rakhi Sawant as Begum – A thief along with her lover Badshah who stole many precious things to have a lavish living with him.
 Ketan Singh as Badshah – A thief along with his lover Begum who stole many precious things to have a lavish living with her.
 Tunisha Sharma as ASP Aditi Jammwal from Hero - Gayab Mode On. She was handling the case along with Maddam Sir. (2021)
 Deepak Pareek as Honourable Secretary Advocate Dakshesh Joshipura from Wagle Ki Duniya - Nayi Peedhi Naye Kissey. He came to take back the stolen gold "Kalash".
 Sayantani Ghosh as Daljeet Bagga from Tera Yaar Hoon Main. She came to take back her daughter's stolen necklace.
 Vijay Kashyap as Col. Pushpinder Batra – Director of Parakram SAF from Ziddi Dil Maane Na.
 Gulfam Khan as Mrs. Batra from Ziddi Dil Maane Na.
 Karan Veer Mehra as Abhay: Koel's husband from Ziddi Dil Maane Na.
 Prathmesh Sharma as Bala: Cadet of Parakram SAF from Ziddi Dil Maane Na.
 Shaleen Malhotra as Special Agent Karan Shergill from Ziddi Dil Maane Na.
 Kaveri Priyam as Cadet Dr. Monami Mahajan from Ziddi Dil Maane Na.
 Kunal Karan Kapoor as Cadet Siddharth Ganju from Ziddi Dil Maane Na.
 Diljot Kaur Chhabra as Special Agent Sanjana Dubey from Ziddi Dil Maane Na.
 Aditya Deshmukh as Special Agent Faizuddin Siddiqui from Ziddi Dil Maane Na.
 Simple Kaul as Cadet Koel Roy from Ziddi Dil Maane Na.

Production

Development
Before its premiere, it was titled Mahila Police Thana but was later changed to Maddam Sir. In early February 2020, the main cast promoted the series in Lucknow.

Casting
Bhavika Sharma quit the show in 2022 as she was not happy with the growth of her character in the show.

Controversy
The series first time made a controversy with the alleged war of words between lead Gulki Joshi and Shilpa Shinde in February 2023. While Shinde who was cast to do a cameo role Naina Mathur, alleged team for "Not being serious about work" and accused makers of "not giving satisfactory role to her" days after her arrival, to which Joshi and Sonali Naik claimed that "If we were so unprofessional then the show wouldn't have existed for three long years", taking a dig at Shinde's comments she further said that, "Audience is the best judge and all the fifteen minutes of fame can rest in peace." Later on Shinde produced a three minute long video on her Instagram handle and accused Joshi and Naik of insulting her and said, "Who's Gulki Joshi? What has she done in her career? She became popular due to me" and also said that "Cast can't accept some positive changes in show with new entries when the show is on the verge of getting off-air and the TRPs increased due to me." To which Joshi took a dig and claimed that "She abused our whole cast for the sake of limelight and I'm really very grateful to her that I'm getting so much love and support due to this controversy and my followers also increased due to same."

Crossover
The Big Shanivaar is Mahasangam (crossover) of all Sony SAB (except Taarak Mehta Ka Ooltah Chashmah) shows telecasting at that time on 9 October 2021 to promote Sony SAB telecasting their shows on Saturday also.

The Big Shanivaar is Mahasangam (crossover) of all Sony SAB (except Taarak Mehta Ka Ooltah Chashmah) shows telecasting at that time on 20 November 2021 on the occasion of Diwali in Parakram SAF (Ziddi Dil Maane Na) and to help its Cadet Koel Roy in escaping from her husband.

Shaam Shaandar is the New Year special, a one-hour special episode on 31 December 2021 along with Ziddi Dil Maane Na and Wagle Ki Duniya – Nayi Peedhi Naye Kissey.

Sequel
After a successful run of three-years it went off-air on 18 February 2023. However  producer Kinnari Mehta announced that they will come back with Season 2 and are working for the same. It was announced in the end of finale episode of Season 1 also where in a twist of events it was revealed that Haseena survived the fatal blast and later whole cast as Team MPT announced their return with Season 2 soon.

Awards and nominations

See also 
 List of Maddam Sir Episodes
 List of programs broadcast by Sony SAB
 List of Hindi comedy shows

References

External links 
 
 Maddam Sir on SonyLIV

Sony SAB original programming
2020 Indian television series debuts
Indian television sitcoms
Television shows set in Uttar Pradesh
Fictional portrayals of police departments in India